Kozienice Landscape Park is a protected area (Landscape Park) in east-central Poland, established in 1983, covering an area of .

The Park lies within Masovian Voivodeship. It takes its name from the town of Kozienice.

Kozienice nature reserves
Within the Landscape Park are the 15 nature reserves of importance for wildlife, flora and fauna, including: Zagożdżon (65.67 ha), Ponty im. T. Zielińskiego (36.61 ha), Brzeźniczka (122.48 ha), Załamanek (78.97 ha), Pionki (81.60 ha), Ciszek (40.28 ha), Jedlnia (86.42 ha), Miodne (20.38 ha), Ługi Helenowskie (93.56 ha), Krępiec (278.96 ha), Ponty Dęby (50.40 ha), Leniwa (26.89 ha), Źródło Królewskie (29.67 ha), Okólny Ług (168.94 ha), and Guść (87.09 ha).

References

 	

Kozienice
Parks in Masovian Voivodeship